Louis Belanger may refer to:

 Louis Bélanger (born 1964), Canadian film director and screenwriter
 Louis Belanger (painter) (1756–1816), French-born Swedish landscape artist